Rosenort is a hamlet in Coulee Rural Municipality No. 136, Saskatchewan, Canada. The hamlet is located on Range Rd. 123 5 km north of Highway 379, about 25 km south of Swift Current.

Demographics

In 2006, Rosenort had a population of 0 living in 0 dwellings, a 60% decrease from 2001.

See also

 List of communities in Saskatchewan
 Hamlets of Saskatchewan

References

Unincorporated communities in Saskatchewan
Coulee No. 136, Saskatchewan